Cycling at the 2015 European Youth Summer Olympic Festival

Medal summary

Medal table

Medal events

Boys

Girls

References

2015 European Youth Summer Olympic Festival
2015 in road cycling
Cycle racing in Georgia (country)
2015